Adolf Borchers (10 February 1913 – 9 February 1996) was a Luftwaffe flying ace of World War II. He was credited with 132 aerial victories—that is, 132 aerial combat encounters resulting in the destruction of the enemy aircraft—claimed in approximately 800 combat missions.

Biography
Borchers was born on 10 February 1913 in Wendhausen near Lüneburg. He had two brothers who also received the Knight's Cross. Major Walter Borchers was a night fighter pilot and wing commander. A second brother, SS-Hauptsturmführer Hermann Borchers served in the 9th SS Panzer Division Hohenstaufen.

He joined the Condor Legion in the fall of 1938 and participated as an Unteroffizier in the Spanish Civil War. After the Spanish Civil War he was transferred to 2. Staffel (2nd squadron) of Jagdgeschwader 77 (JG 77—77th Fighter Wing) which later became 10. Staffel of Jagdgeschwader 51 (JG 51—51st Fighter Wing) on 21 November 1940. In this unit he fought in the Invasion of Poland, Battle of France and Battle of Britain, claiming two aerial victories. On 19 May 1940, he claimed his first aerial victory over a Hawker Hurricane in the vicinity of Le Cateau

Following aerial combat on 31 August 1940, Borchers ditched his Messerschmitt Bf 109 E-1 (Werknummer 5808—factory number) in the Thames Estuary but was rescued. That day, I. Gruppe (1st group) of JG 77 lost seven Bf 109s in combat over southeastern England, with one pilot killed in action and five taken prisoner of war.

Eastern Front
During Operation Barbarossa, the German invasion of the Soviet Union, he accumulated further victories and by the end of 1941 his score had increased to 23 aerial victories. After being promoted to an Officers rank he was appointed Staffelkapitän (squadron leader) of 11. Staffel of JG 51 on 20 August 1942, replacing Leutnant Wolfgang Böwing-Treuding who was transferred to 10. Staffel. By the end of 1942, his number of aerial victories had increased to 38.

In 1943, Borchers married the famed skier Christl Cranz. For 78 aerial victories Borchers was awarded the Knight's Cross of the Iron Cross.

Group commander

On 10 June 1944, I. Gruppe was ordered to an airfield named Peloniczna near Lviv. Seven days later, they were moved to Serpneve. On 11 June, Borchers was appointed Gruppenkommandeur (group commander) of I. Gruppe of Jagdgeschwader 52 (JG 52—52nd Fighter Wing) replacing Hauptmann Johannes Wiese who had been injured in combat on 19 May 1944. Command of 11. Staffel of JG 51 was then passed to Oberleutnant Horst Walther. On 22 June, Soviet forces launched Operation Bagration, attacking Army Group Centre in Byelorussia, with the objective of encircling and destroying its main component armies. On 24 June, the Gruppe transferred to Galați and again to Peloniczna. Borchers claimed his 100 aerial victory on 24 July 1944. He was the 86th Luftwaffe pilot to achieve the century mark. The Gruppe reached Grabowiec in eastern Poland on 27 July and Kraków on 1 August. On 12 August they were again relocated and moved to Mzurowa.

His 118th victory claimed on 2 September 1944, is also noted for claiming JG 52 10,000th aerial victory. Borchers was given command to III. Gruppe of JG 52 on 1 February 1945. He succeeded Hauptmann Wilhelm Batz who was transferred to take command of II. Gruppe of JG 52. Command of I. Gruppe of JG 52 was passed to Hauptmann Erich Hartmann. Together with his comrades he surrendered to U.S. force only to be turned over to Soviet forces.

After World War II he and his wife, Christl Cranz, founded a Ski school which she led until 1987.

Summary of career

Aerial victory claims
According to US historian David T. Zabecki, Borchers was credited with 132 aerial victories. Spick also lists Borchers with 132 aerial victories, 127 of which on the Eastern Front and five during the Battle of France and Battle of Britain, claimed in over 800 combat missions. Mathews and Foreman, authors of Luftwaffe Aces — Biographies and Victory Claims, researched the German Federal Archives and also state that Borchers was credited with 132 aerial victories, including two on the Western Front and the others on the Eastern Front.

Victory claims were logged to a map-reference (PQ = Planquadrat), for example "PQ PQ 47764". These sectors were then subdivided into 36 smaller units to give a location area 3 × 4 km in size.

Awards
Iron Cross (1939) 2nd and 1st class
Honour Goblet of the Luftwaffe on 20 October 1941 as Oberfeldwebel in a Jagdgeschwader
German Cross in Gold on 15 October 1942 as Oberleutnant in the 11./Jagdgeschwader 51
Knight's Cross of the Iron Cross on 22 November 1943 as Hauptmann and Staffelkapitän of the 11./Jagdgeschwader 51 "Mölders"

Notes

References

Citations

Bibliography

 
 
 
 
 
 
 
 
 
 
 
 
 
 
 
 
 
 
  
 
 

1913 births
1996 deaths
People from Lüneburg (district)
Condor Legion personnel
German World War II flying aces
Luftwaffe pilots
Recipients of the Gold German Cross
Recipients of the Knight's Cross of the Iron Cross
German prisoners of war in World War II held by the Soviet Union
People from the Province of Hanover
Military personnel from Lower Saxony